Willard Meeks Jr.  is an American pianist, organist, songwriter, and music producer. Some of his credits  include Kanye West's  album Late Registration, song Crack Music from Roc-A-Fella Records, The New York Community Choir (RCA records), Glenn Jones (Jive Records), and Martha Wash. He is also known for being Whitney Houston's touring keyboard player during the Greatest Love World Tour. Meeks is a graduate of Manhattan School of Music where he earned a Bachelor's degree in music.

References

Year of birth missing (living people)
Living people
Manhattan School of Music alumni
American male pianists
21st-century American pianists
21st-century American male musicians